The Redoubt St. Archangel Michael Site, also known as the Old Sitka Site and now in Old Sitka State Historical Park, is a National Historic Landmark near Sitka, Alaska. It was the first non-Native settlement on Baranof Island. It was declared a National Historic Landmark in 1962, and was made a state park in 1966.

History
In 1779, Alexander Baranov, a leader of the Russian-American Company, arrived near the site of modern Sitka, and negotiated with the local Tlingit people for a site on which the company could establish an outpost.  Although he would have preferred what is now called Castle Hill in Sitka, he was granted this site on Starrigavan Bay.  It was not until 1799 that the company established a presence, building a number of log buildings, surrounded by a palisade.  In 1802 the Tlingit attacked and destroyed the premises. The Russians returned to the area in force in 1804, and established a permanent presence at Castle Hill after the Battle of Sitka. Replacements were built in 1808, 1823, 1836 and 1894. In 1900 an agricultural station was built and demolished after 1955.

The site was excavated in 1934-35, at which time archaeologists recovered numerous artifacts and identified the locations of the Russian buildings of the former redoubt.  In the years that followed the site was partially compromised by erosion and construction activity. 1 The state built a wayside stop at the site in 1966, and now operates it as a state park.  It was designated a National Historic Landmark (as "Redoubt St. Archangel Michael Site") in 1962, and listed on the National Register of Historic Places in 1966 (as "Old Sitka Site").

See also
List of National Historic Landmarks in Alaska
National Register of Historic Places listings in Sitka City and Borough, Alaska

References

State parks of Alaska
National Historic Landmarks in Alaska
Protected areas of Sitka, Alaska
Russian-American culture in Alaska
Archaeological sites on the National Register of Historic Places in Alaska
Populated places established in 1799
National Register of Historic Places in Sitka, Alaska
1799 establishments in North America
Protected areas established in 1966
1966 establishments in Alaska